Belvidere Café, Motel and Gas Station is a historic building in Litchfield, Illinois along Route 66.  The site also has a residence and two motel units.

History
In 1929, Albina and Vincenzo Cerolla built a one-room, frame gas station with a single pump to serve motorists on Route 66. The station also sold motor oil and other automobile accessories and necessities. The station operated under a lease as part of the Johnson Oil Refining Company of Chicago. In 1936, they expanded with a new brick gas station, a café, four motel rooms with individual automobile garages, and a small house for the owners. The restaurant was known as Cerolla's Café.

Edith, the daughter of the Cerollas, and her husband Lester "Curly" Kranich continued the business after the death of Edith's parents. The Kraniches demolished the original house on the property in the 1950s and built a new one with a garage. They also expanded the motel at this time, adding two identical wings. The Kraniches also had to reorient the entrances when a new four-lane bypass opened on the other side of the property in the 1940s.

The construction of Interstate 55 in the 1970s would mark the end of the once-thriving family business by diverting highway traffic westward. The café closed in 1971. The Kraniches retired in 1975, closing the facility. The café, motel, and gas station buildings were kept in relatively good condition but were used primarily for storage. The property sits largely vacant; the buildings are for sale. The current owner occasionally rents a room in one of the wings.

See also
 List of motels

References

External links
 Historical Society of Montgomery County Illinois

National Register of Historic Places in Montgomery County, Illinois
Transportation buildings and structures in Montgomery County, Illinois
Litchfield, Illinois
Buildings and structures on U.S. Route 66
U.S. Route 66 in Illinois
Restaurants in Illinois
Hotels in Illinois
Motels in the United States
Hotels established in 1936
Retail buildings in Illinois
Commercial buildings on the National Register of Historic Places in Illinois
1936 establishments in Illinois
Gas stations on the National Register of Historic Places in Illinois
Hotel buildings on the National Register of Historic Places in Illinois
Restaurants on the National Register of Historic Places